The 1988 Senator Windows Welsh Professional Championship was a professional non-ranking snooker tournament, which took place between 8 and 12 February 1988 at the Newport Centre in Newport, Wales.

Terry Griffiths won the tournament defeating Wayne Jones 9–3 in the final.

Main draw

References

Welsh Professional Championship
Welsh Professional Championship
Welsh Professional Championship
Welsh Professional Championship